Kentucky's 12th congressional district was a district of the United States House of Representatives in Kentucky. It was lost to redistricting in 1843. Its last Representative was Garrett Davis.

List of members representing the district

References

 Congressional Biographical Directory of the United States 1774–present

11
Former congressional districts of the United States
Constituencies established in 1823
1823 establishments in Kentucky
Constituencies disestablished in 1843
1843 disestablishments in Kentucky